James M. Kasparoff (born January 9, 1974) is a retired California horse trainer whose premier horse, Bob Black Jack, raced in the 2008 Kentucky Derby. He trains a stable of five horses owned by his brother Tim Kasparoff and Jeff Harmon.

Bob Black Jack won the California Breeders' Champion Stakes as a two-year-old, giving Kasparoff his first career stakes winner, and later set a track record for six furlongs in the Sunshine Millions Dash Stakes at Santa Anita. The horse was the last entry accepted to the 2008  Kentucky Derby. He led the first  half of the race before falling back in the pack, ultimately finishing 16th.

Kasparoff blogged about the 2008 Derby for the New York Times.

References

1974 births
American racehorse trainers
American bloggers
Living people
Sportspeople from California
British racehorse trainers